Nalchha also known as Nalcha is a small town in Dhar district in the state of Madhya Pradesh, India. It is situated 25 km away from Dhar, which is both district & sub-district headquarter of Nalchha village. The total geographical area of village is 1598.8 hectares.

Assembly
As per 2019 stats, Nalchha villages comes under Dharampuri assembly.

Parliamentary constituency
Nalcha Village comes under Dhar parliamentary constituency.

Population
As per Population Census 2011, the Nalchha village has population of 6186 of which 3163 are males while 3023 are females.

Geography

Nearest Stations

Airport
Devi Ahilya Bai Holkar Airport, Indore 70 km From Nalcha village.

Railway Station
Indore Junction railway station, Indore.

Bus Stand
The nearest bus stand from Nalcha is Bus Stand, nalchha.

References

Cities and towns in Dhar district